Kha Yay is a 2019 Burmese drama film, directed by Wyne starring Myint Myat and Wutt Hmone Shwe Yi. The film, produced by Na Garr Min Film Production premiered in Myanmar on September 5, 2019.

Cast
Myint Myat as Gezo
Wutt Hmone Shwe Yi as Ku Ku Naing
Lu Mone as U Maung Ko
San Htut as Myint Mo
Win Myaing as U Win Myint

References

External links

2019 films
2010s Burmese-language films
Burmese drama films
Films shot in Myanmar
2019 drama films
Films directed by Wyne